Ebrechtella is a genus of crab spiders that was first described by Friedrich Dahl in 1907.

Species
 it contains ten species and one subspecies, found in Asia and Europe:
Ebrechtella concinna (Thorell, 1877) (type) – Pakistan to Philippines, Indonesia (Sulawesi), New Guinea
Ebrechtella hongkong (Song, Zhu & Wu, 1997) – China
Ebrechtella juwangensis Seo, 2015 – Korea
Ebrechtella margaritacea (Simon, 1909) – Vietnam
Ebrechtella pseudovatia (Schenkel, 1936) – Bhutan, China, Taiwan
Ebrechtella sufflava (O. Pickard-Cambridge, 1885) – Pakistan
Ebrechtella timida (Thorell, 1887) – Myanmar
Ebrechtella tricuspidata (Fabricius, 1775) – Europe, Turkey, Caucasus, Russia (Europe to Far East), Kazakhstan, Iran, Central Asia, China, Korea, Japan
Ebrechtella t. concolor (Caporiacco, 1935) – Karakorum
Ebrechtella xinjiangensis (Hu & Wu, 1989) – China
Ebrechtella xinjie (Song, Zhu & Wu, 1997) – China

In synonymy:
E. arciger (Grube, 1861) = Ebrechtella tricuspidata (Fabricius, 1775)
E. dierythra (Thorell, 1892) = Ebrechtella concinna (Thorell, 1877)
E. expallidata (O. Pickard-Cambridge, 1885) = Ebrechtella sufflava (O. Pickard-Cambridge, 1885)
E. fruhstorferi Dahl, 1907 = Ebrechtella concinna (Thorell, 1877)
E. gamma (Chrysanthus, 1964) = Ebrechtella concinna (Thorell, 1877)
E. maygitgitus (Barrion & Litsinger, 1995) = Ebrechtella concinna (Thorell, 1877)
E. pavesii (O. Pickard-Cambridge, 1873) = Ebrechtella tricuspidata (Fabricius, 1775)
E. silveryi (Tikader, 1965) = Ebrechtella concinna (Thorell, 1877)
E. subargentata (O. Pickard-Cambridge, 1885) = Ebrechtella concinna (Thorell, 1877)
E. wenensis (Zhu, Song & Tang, 1995) = Ebrechtella pseudovatia (Schenkel, 1936)

See also
 List of Thomisidae species

References

Further reading

Araneomorphae genera
Spiders of Asia
Taxa named by Friedrich Dahl
Thomisidae